This is a list of seasons completed by the East Carolina Pirates men's college basketball team.

Seasons

  Lebo coached the first 6 games of the season, going 2–4. Perry went 8–16 as the interim head coach.

Notes

East Carolina Pirates
East Carolina Pirates men's basketball seasons
East Carolina Pirates basketball seasons